The Church of the Immaculate Concepcion of Tamontaka, also known as the Tamontaka Church is a Roman Catholic church in Cotabato City, Philippines.

The church was established by Jesuit priests as part of the Tamontaka Mission which focused on the youth as well as the evangelization of Christianity in the Cotabato region in the late 19th century. The original church structure was built in 1872 along the Tamontaka river. Two schools one exclusively for boys and another for girls were established. The former was managed by the Society of Jesus and the latter was run by the Beatas de la Compania de Jesús (now the Religious of the Virgin Mary). The church was moved to its present site in 1879. The Jesuits of Zamboanga took over the establishment in 1899.

In 1939, the church became part of the Cotabato mission of the Oblates of Mary Immaculate. The church building was destroyed in an earthquake on August 17, 1976, and was rebuilt after two years. The building sustained damage in a fire on May 11, 1994, and was repaired within a year. The church was declared a National Historic Landmark on July 19, 2004.

The church is connected to a catacomb through a tunnel. The tunnel itself is part of a network of caves connected to the Pedro Colina Hill.

References

Buildings and structures in Cotabato City
National Historical Landmarks of the Philippines
Roman Catholic churches in Cotabato City
Tourist attractions in Maguindanao del Norte